Élodie Olivarès (born 22 May 1976 in Paris) is a French athlete specialising in the 3000 metres steeplechase. She represented her country at three consecutive World Championships starting in 2005.

Competition record

Personal bests
Outdoor
1500 metres – 4:15.17 (Villeneuve-d'Ascq 2004)
3000 metres – 9:04.73 (Villeneuve-d'Ascq 2003)
5000 metres – 15:44.36 (Rome 2003)
3000 metres steeplechase – 9:33.12 (Heusden-Zolder 2002)
Indoor
3000 metres – 9:03.13 (Liévin 2009)

Prize list 
cross country running
French Champion - long course in 2002, 2003 and 2006
Vice-champion of France for Cross Country long course  in 2004.
Vice-champion of France for Cross Country short course in 2009.
champion of France in 3000m steeplechase in 2002, 2004, 2006 and 2009
Vice champion of France in 3000m steeplechase in 2001, 2005, 2007, 2008 and 2011.
champion of France in Indoor 3000m  in 2006 and 2007.
record de France in 3000m steeplechase from 2001 to 2007
Gold medal at Mediterranean Games in 2001 (Tunis)
winner at European Cup of  nations in 2004
Team Bronze medal in 2001 at European Cross Country Championships.
22 selections for French teams.

References

1976 births
Living people
French female steeplechase runners
Athletes from Paris
World Athletics Championships athletes for France
French female middle-distance runners
Mediterranean Games gold medalists for France
Mediterranean Games medalists in athletics
Athletes (track and field) at the 2001 Mediterranean Games
21st-century French women